Membrane-associated phosphatidylinositol transfer protein 1 is a protein that in humans is encoded by the PITPNM1 gene.

Function 

PITPNM1 belongs to a family of proteins that share homology with the Drosophila retinal degeneration B (rdgB) protein.[supplied by OMIM]

It was found that aggressive metastasized cancer cells produced more of the PITPNC1 protein. In contrast, tumor cells that had not spread had lower expression of PITPNC1. Studies reveal that PITPNC1 promotes malignant secretion by binding Golgi-resident PI4P and localizing RAB1B to the Golgi. RAB1B localization to the Golgi allows for the recruitment of GOLPH3 (Golgi phosphoprotein 3), which facilitates Golgi extension and enhanced vesicular release. PITPNC1-mediated vesicular release drives metastasis by increasing the secretion of pro-invasive and pro-angiogenic mediators HTRA1, MMP1, FAM3C, PDGFA, and ADAM10.

Interactions 

PITPNM1 has been shown to interact with PTK2B.

References

Further reading